Louise Clare Johnson, (born in 1953) is an Australian geographer and academic. Specializing in gender geography, she is interested in urban and post-colonial developments in Australia. Her theoretical contributions to gender geography, post-colonial geography and city-building in Australia were recognized in 2011 with the Australian International Medal. She is Honorary Fellow of the Melbourne Sustainable Society Institute, at University of Melbourne.

Biography 
Louise Johnson was born in 1953. She studied art at the University of Sydney and earned a doctorate in 1992 at Monash University. She is Honorary Professor of Australian Studies at Deakin University.

Johnson's research focuses on the planning of Australia taking into account gender and the post-colonial context.

During her doctorate, she took a feminist approach to the textile industries in Geelong. According to the contributions of feminist geography, spaces are gendered and surrounded by power issues that privilege men. It analyzes in the region the impacts in economic and social geography of technological developments. It also shows a mobilization of culture and cultural heritage to promote the redevelopment of deindustrialized cities. She participates in the conceptualization, the popularization of studies on gender or including the body, with several retrospectives on these concepts and the tools mobilized. 

Her research opens up debates on the conception and use of the city according to gender.

She then studied housing (microgeography), shopping malls, in residential and suburban areas of Australia.

Johnson is a member of several committees of international journals: Women's Studies International Forum (1986-1997), Gender, Place and Culture: A Journal of Feminist Geography (1993-2006), New Zealand Geographer (1998-2009), An Online Journal of Critical Geography (since 2001) and Canadian Geographer (2002-2004).

Works 
 Tanja Luckins, David Walker and Louise Johnson, The story of Australia: a new history of people and place, 2022
 Louise C. Johnson, Cultural capitals: revaluing the arts, remaking urban spaces, Ashgate Pub, 2009
 Louise Johnson, Gaslight Sydney, George Allen & Unwin, 1984
 Louise Johnson and Jane M. Jacobs, Placebound: Australian feminist geographies, Oxford University Press, 2000

References

External links 
 Interview with Louise Johnson National Library of New Zealand.

Australian academics
Australian geographers
Living people
1953 births
University of Sydney alumni
Monash University alumni
Academic staff of Deakin University